Bikaner State was a princely state in the Rajputana  from 1465 to 1947. The founder of the state, Rao Bika, was the eldest son of Rao Jodha, ruler of Jodhpur. Rao Bika chose to build his own kingdom instead of inheriting his father's. Bika defeated the Jat clans of Jangladesh along with his uncle Rao Kandhal and his adviser Vikramji Rajpurohit and founded his own kingdom. Its capital was the city of Bikaner in the northern area of present-day Rajasthan State in India. Karni Mata has been designated as the kuldevi of the Royal family of Bikaner.

The state was noted for the Bikaner style of painting.

Heeding the 1947 call of Vallabhbhai Patel to integrate the princely states into the new independent India, Bikaner's last king, Maharaja Sadul Singh, advised by his dewan K. M. Panikkar, a respected historian, was one of the first rulers of a princely state to display willingness to join the Indian Union. By issuing a public appeal in April 1947 to his fellow princes to join the Constituent Assembly of India, the Maharaja of Bikaner set an example for other heads of the native states to follow.

History

The state of Bikaner was founded in 1465. It became a British protectorate on 9 March 1818. They were accorded a 17 gun salute by the British authorities. By the time of Indian Independence, the territory of the state of Bikaner shared a border with Pakistan. The accession to the Indian Union was signed by the Maharaja on 7 August 1947.

Rulers
The rulers were Rathor Rajputs. Related to the ruling family of Jodhpur.

Rao/Raja's 

1465 – 1504 Rao Bika 
1504 – 1505 Rao Nar Singh (Naro) 
1505 – 1526 Rao Lunkaran  
1526 – 1542 Rao Jait Singh
1542 – 1571 Rao Kalyan Mal (acknowledged the suzerainty of Emperor Akbar) 
1571 – 1612 Rao / Raja Rai Singh I (Important General in the Mughal army. Given title of Raja. From 1585 to 1594 he was employed in the Deccan by Emperor Akbar, where he was Subedar of Burhanpur) 
1612 – 1613 Raja Dalpat (Sur Singh revolted against his elder brother Dalpat and killed him along with his guards with the consent of Emperor Jahangir) 
1613 – 1631 Raja Sur Singh 
1631 – 1667 Raja Karan Singh(deposed by Aurangzeb and exiled to Karanapura in the Deccan) 
1667 – 1669 Interregnum

Maharaja's
1669 – 1698 Maharaja Anup Singh (First to be granted title of Maharaja by Emperor Aurangzeb)  
19 Jun 1698 – 15 December 1700: Maharaja Sarup Singh (b. 1689 – d. 1700) 
15 Dec 1700 – 16 December 1735: Maharaja Sujan Singh (b. 1690 – d. 1735) 
16 Dec 1735 – 15 May 1746: Maharaja Zorawar Singh (b. 1713 – d. 1746) 
15 May 1746 – 25 March 1787: Maharaja Gaj Singh (b. 1723 – d. 1787) 
25 Mar 1787 – 25 April 1787: Maharaja Raj Singh II (b. 1744 – d. 1787) 
25 Apr 1787 – 9 October 1787: Maharaja Pratap Singh (b. 1781 – d. 1787) 
25 Apr 1787 – 25 March 1828: Maharaja Surat Singh (Regent to 9 October 1787) (b. 1766 – d. 1828) 
25 Mar 1828 – 7 August 1851: Maharaja  Ratan Singh (b. 1790 – d. 1851) 
 7 August 1851 – 16 May 1872: Maharaja Sardar Sungh (b. 1818 – d. 1872) 
16 May 1872 – 19 August 1887: Maharaja Dungar Singh (b. 1854 – d. 1887) 
19 Aug 1887 – 2 February 1943: Maharaja Ganga Singh (b. 1880 – d. 1943) (from 24 July 1901, Sir Ganga Singh)
19 Aug 1887 – 16 December 1898: the British Political Agents-Regent
 2 February 1943 – 15 August 1950: Maharaja Sadul Singh (b. 1902 – d. 1950) (from 1 January 1946, Sir Sadul Singh)

Titular Rulers
1950 – 1971 Maharaja Karni Singh (Privy purses were withdrawn in 1971 and post & titles were also withdrawn)
1988-present Maharajah Narendra Singh Bahadur

Dewans
The Dewans and Chief Ministers of the state were:
 1460–1465 Bothra Bachhraj (Mantri-Dewan / Jodhpur) / Rao Jodha
 1465–1505 Bothra Bachhraj (Founding Dewan / Bikaner) / Rao Bika
 1504–1526 Karam Singh  Bothra Bachhawat (Descendants of Bachhraj were known as Bachhawats) / Rao Nar Singh and Rao Lunkaran
 1526–1535 Var Singh Bothra Bachhawat / Rao Jait Singh
 1535–1542 Nagraj Bothra Bachhawat / Rao Jait Singh and Rao Kalyan Mal
 1542–1571 Sangram Singh Bothra Bachhawat / Rao Kalyan Mal
 1571–1591 Mehta Karam Chand bothra Bachhawat (Title of Mehta granted by Emperor Akbar) / Rao Kalyan Mal and Raja Rai Singh
 1619–1620 Mehta Bhag Chand Bothra Bachhawat / Raja Sur Singh 
 1619–1620 Mehta Lakshmi Chand Bothra Bachhawat / Raja Sur Singh
17.. – 26 February 1733: Anand Ram Khawas (d. 1733)
1735 – Feb 1751: Mohata Bakhtawar Singh (1st time) (b. 1707 – d. 1779)
Feb 1751 – 1752: Amar Singh Chaturbhujani
1752 – 1756: Mohata Bakhtawar Singh (2nd time) (s.a.)
1756 – Dec 1757: Mohata Prithvi Singh
1757 – 1762: Mohata Bakhtawar Singh (3rd time) (s.a.)
1762 – Sep 1765: Shah Mool Chand Bardiya
Sep 1765 – 1779: Mohata Bakhtawar Singh (4th time) (s.a.)
1779 – 178.: Mohata Swaroop Singh
178. – 1787: Mohata Thakursi
1787 – 1791: Mohata Madho Rai
1791 – 1794: Pratap Mal Baid
1794 – 1805: Mohata Rao Sahib Singh Gun Roop
Apr 1805 – Apr 1815: Amar Chand Surana
Apr 1815 – Feb 1816: Mohata Bhom ji
Feb 1816 – 1828: Abhai Singh Mohta
1828 – 184.: Hindu Mal Baid
c. 1841: Sri Narayan Singh Bhati
1844 – 1852?: Sarana Shri Lakshmichand
1852 – 1853: Guman Singh Baid (1st time)
1853 – 1853: Leeladhar Mohata + Jalam Chand Kochar
1853 – 1854: Lachhi Ram Rakhecha
1854 – 1856: Guman Singh Baid (2nd time)
1856: Pandit Dojainant
1856 – 1863: Ram Lal Dwarkani (1st time)
1864 – 1865: Guman Singh Baid (3rd time)
1865 – 1866: Ram Lal Dwarkani (2nd time)
1866: Man Mal Rakhecha
1866 (3 months): Sheo Lal Nahata                    
1867 (15 days): Fateh Chand Surana 
1867: Ganga Ram Purohit
1867: Shah Mal Kochar
1868: Man Mal Rakhecha
1868: Sheo Lal Mohata
1868: Lakshmi Chand Nahata
Jun 1868 – Aug 1869: Visayat Hussain
Aug 1869 – 13 December 1873: Pandit Manphool
Dec 1873 – 188.: Maharaj Lal Singh
188. – 1884?: Maharao Hari Singh Baid
1884 – 11 October 1888: Amin Muhammad
12 Dec 1888 – 1896: Sodhi Hukam Singh
1896 – 1898: Raghubar Singh Chauhan
1898 – 1903: Hamidu Zafar Khan
1903 – 1916: Post abolished

Chief ministers
 1916 – 19..: Shri Bhairon Singh
 7 September 1920 – Jan 1925: Prince Kunwar Sardul Singh (s.a.)

Dewans
The post of Dewan was reinstated in 1927.
 1927 – 1934: Manubhai Nandshankar Mehta (b. 1868 – d. 1946)
 3 October 1932 – 31 October 1934: Ram Prasad Dube (acting)
 1 November 1934 – Jan 1936: Maharaj Shri Bhairun Singh
 Jan 1936 – Dec 1936: Thakur Sadul Singh
 Dec 1936 – 1938?: V.N. Mehta
 Dec 1938 – Jul 1939: Kailash Narain Haksar (b. 1878 – d. 1954)
 Jul 1939 – 1944?: Sire Mal Bapna (b. 1882 – d. 1964)
 1944 – 13 March 1948: Kavalam Madhava Panikkar (b. 1895 – d. 1963)
 14 March 1948 – Oct 1948: Kanwar Jaswant Singh
 Oct 1948 – 30 March 1949: C. S. Venkatachar (b. 1899 – d. 1999)

Family tree of the rulers of Bikaner

 I. Rao Bikaji, of Bikaner (1438–1504; Rai: 1488; r. 1465–1504)
 II.Rao Naroji, of Bikaner (1468–1505; r. 1504–1505)
  III.Rao Lunkaraji, of Bikaner (1470–1526; r. 1505–1526)
  IV. Rao Jetaji, of Bikaner (1489–1542; r. 1526–1542)
  V.Rao Kalyan Mal, of Bikaner (1519–1574; r. 1542–1574)
  VI. Rai Singh I, Raja of Bikaner (1541–1612; r. 1574–1612)
 VII. Dalpat Singh, Rai of Bikaner (1565–1613; r. 1612–1613)
  VIII. Sur Singh, Raja of Bikaner (1594–1631; r. 1613–1631)
  IX. Karan Singh, Raja of Bikaner (1616–1669; r. 1631–1667)
  X. Anup Singh, Maharaja of Bikaner (1638–1698; r. 1667–1698; Rao: 1667; Maharaja: 1675)
 XI. Sarup Singh, Maharaja of Bikaner (1689–1700; r. 1698–1700)
 XII. Sujjan Singh, Maharaja of Bikaner (1690–1735; r. 1700–1735)
  XIII. Zorawar Singh, Maharaja of Bikaner (1713–1746; r. 1735–1746)
 Anand Singh
  XIV. Gaj Singh, Maharaja of Bikaner (1723–1787; r. 1746–1787)
 XV. Raj Singh II, Maharaja of Bikaner (1744–1787; r. 1787)
  XVI. Pratap Singh, Maharaja of Bikaner (1781–1787; r. 1787)
  XVII. Surat Singh, Maharaja of Bikaner (1765–1828; r. 1787–1828)
  XVIII. Ratan Singh, Maharaja of Bikaner (1790–1851; r. 1828–1851)
  XIX. Sardar Singh, Maharaja of Bikaner (1818–1872; r. 1851–1872) 
Chhatar Singh (1762–1779)
 Dalel Singh
 Sagat Singh
 Lall Singh (1831–1887)
 XX. Dungar Singh, Maharaja of Bikaner (1854–1887; r. 1872–1887)
  XXI. Ganga Singh, Maharaja of Bikaner GCSI, GCIE, GCVO, GBE, KCB (1880–1943; r. 1887–1943)
  XXII. Sadul Singh, Maharaja of Bikaner GCSI, GCIE, CVO (1902–1950; r. 1943–1949; titular ruler: 1949–1950)
XXIII. Karni Singh, Maharaja of Bikaner (1924–1988; titular Maharaja: 1950–1971; family head: 1971–1988)
 XXIV. Narendra Singh, Maharaja of Bikaner (1946–2003; family head: 1988–2003)
 Amar Singh (1925-2007)
 Chandra Shekhar Singh (b. 1948)
 XXV. Ravi Raj Singh, Maharaja of Bikaner (1977-2022; family head: 2003–2022)

See also

 Mughal Empire
 Maratha Empire
 Rajputana
 History of Bikaner
 Political integration of India
 Rajputana Chronicles: Guns and Glories – The thousand-year story of the Bachhawat clan

References

External links

States and territories disestablished in 1947
Princely states of India
History of Bikaner
History of Rajasthan
Rajputs
Rajputana Agency
1465 establishments in Asia
15th-century establishments in India
1947 disestablishments in India
Historical Hindu empires
Rathores
 Rajput princely states